Ayana V. Jackson (born 1977) is an American photographer and filmmaker. Born in Livingston, New Jersey, she received her B.A. in Sociology from Spelman College in 1999.  In 2005, at the invitation of professor Katharina Sieverding, she studied critical theory and large format printing at the University of Arts Berlin. She is best known for her focus on Contemporary Africa and the African Diaspora, most notably the series African by Legacy, Mexican by Birth, Leapfrog (a bit of the Other) Grand Matron Army, and Archival Impulse.

Biography
Ayana Vellissia Jackson was born in Livingston, New Jersey and raised in East Orange, New Jersey where her family has long held residence. Her grandmother Angenetta Still Jackson, is a descendant of Leah Arthur Jones—a member of the founding family of New Jersey's first Black Settlement, Lawnside, New Jersey. Her grandfather, J. Garfield Jackson, was Essex County's first African American principal. The city of East Orange later named Jackson Academy elementary school after him. She traveled to Ghana in 2001, where she visited her family's compound in North Odorkor. During this trip she produced her first photography series, "Full Circle: A Survey of Hip Hop in Ghana."

Photographic career
Jackson initially studied sociology and photography during her undergraduate years at Spelman College. She continued her training while at the Berlin University of the Arts, and at a series of photography residencies including the Bakery Photographic Collective and Cité Internationale Universitaire de Paris, France.

Her photographic series "Full Circle: A Survey of Hip Hop in Ghana," "Viajes Personales," and "African by Legacy, Mexican by Birth" have been exhibited in association with Gallery MOMO (Johannesburg, RSA), Rush Arts Gallery (US), A Gathering of the Tribes (US), Galerie Peter Herrmann (Germany), Mexican Museum (US) the Franklin H. Williams CCC/African Diaspora Institute (US) and Culturesfrance (FR), the US State Department and the World Bank.

She has received grants from the Inter-American Foundation and Puma Creative; the latter supported her participation in the 2009 Bamako African Photography Biennial (Rencontres africaines de la photographie).

Her public art exhibitions include Round 32 of Project Row Houses (US) in Houston's 3rd ward.

Her photography can be found in publications including the exhibition catalogue for her series "African by Legacy, Mexican by Birth," "Souls: A Critical Journal of Black Politics, Culture, and Society" (Columbia University), Camera Austria, and the New York Times blog called Lens. She has lectured and conducted workshops at university and arts institutions in the US, Colombia. Mexico, Venezuela, and Nicaragua. Ayana V. Jackson got grants from the Marguerite Casey Foundation, Inter American Foundation, US State Department, French Institute and New York Foundation for the Arts (NYFA) Fellowship for photography.

Full Circle: A Survey of Hip Hop in Ghana
In "Full Circle," Jackson provides a stimulating visual documentary of the Ghanaian music scene. Not often are we able to visualize how Hip Hop has stretched past our U.S. boundaries, especially into Africa. "Full Circle" allows viewers to engage intimately in the appropriated, reshaped culture. She reveals to us- through examination of musicians and industry professionals- that an ostensibly lucrative western model has swayed the creation of Hip Life. Nonetheless, Jackson softens the edges of Hip Life adding warmth and character to each photo, making each more inviting to the audience and compelling us to form our own opinions of how and why Hip Life is transformative. Such fluidity is necessary in developing discussions of cultural metamorphosis.

African by Legacy, Mexican by Birth
In "African By Legacy, Mexican By Birth," the extraordinary photographic work of Jackson and the powerful narrative of Marco Villalobos brings inspired insight in
addressing the role of racial and cultural citizenship as it impacts the lives of African descendants in Mexico and throughout the Americas. The exhibition actively speaks to
the spirit of the maroon Yanga of Mexico who valiantly fought for the liberation of his people and assured the continuing presence of Afro Mexicans as an integral part of our
African legacy in the Americas. Selections from "African By Legacy, Mexican by Birth" were presented throughout Latin America in venues such as Altos de Chavon, La
Romana, Dominican Republic; La Fe Theater, Ciudad Juarez, Mexico; Universidad Autonomia de Nicaragua and the Colsubsidio, Bogota, Colombia.

Film
Jackson, Ayana V. and Marco Villalobos, Rompiendo el Silencio, 12 minutes Spanish/English subtitles

In collaboration with writer and filmmaker Marco Villalobos, Rompiendo el Silencio is Jackson & Villalobos's ongoing work in sound vision. A meditation on common struggle, a celebration of diversity, and a contemplation on the origins of modern maroonage. Rompiendo el Silencio frames history and urgency in the here and now. This film combines first-person narrative with images captured by Jackson and Villalobos on Super 8. Sound art composed by Marco Villalobos is mixed with interviews conducted during their 2003 and 2005 trips.

Exhibitions

Solo

Group

External links
Ayana V. Jackson Official Website
Bamako Encounters Webpage
Bamako Encounters web slideshow on Le Point (French News Publication)
Exhibition announcement (World Bank Art Program)
Gallery MOMO, Johannesburg, South Africa
Galerie Peter Herrmann, Berlin Germany

References

Living people
1977 births
American photographers
American women photographers
African-American artists
Spelman College alumni
People from East Orange, New Jersey
People from Livingston, New Jersey